James May Rutter (May 13, 1841 – November 23, 1907) was an American soldier who fought for the Union Army during the American Civil War. He received the Medal of Honor for valor.

Biography
Rutter served in the 143rd Pennsylvania Infantry Regiment. He received the Medal of Honor on October 30, 1896 for his actions at the Battle of Gettysburg on July 1, 1863, when he assisted Colonel George N. Reichard, who was wounded, to safety.

Medal of Honor citation

Citation:

At great risk of his life went to the assistance of a wounded comrade, and while under fire removed him to a place of safety.

See also

List of American Civil War Medal of Honor recipients: Q-S

References

External links

Military Times

1841 births
1907 deaths
Union Army soldiers
United States Army Medal of Honor recipients
American Civil War recipients of the Medal of Honor